Michael Sahl Hansen (born March 10, 1978) is a Danish handball player, currently playing for Danish Handball League side FCK Håndbold. He is the team's captain, and in 2008, he led his team to their first ever Danish championship.

External links
 player info

1978 births
Living people
Danish male handball players